Bradley Swancott (born 23 July 1979), is an Australian former footballer.

Club career
Born in  Newcastle, New South Wales, Swancott represented local side Newcastle Breakers in the National Soccer League, making his debut aged just 16. However, he spent most of his time there as understudy to Bob Catlin, and totaled only 21 matches in 5 years. When the breakers dissolved in 2000, Swancott joined the newly formed Newcastle Jets, where he made 4 appearances.

After his release by the Jets, Swancott spent time with NSW Premier League teams, including Bankstown City, Parramatta Eagles and APIA Leichhardt. He then returned to Newcastle to play for local sides Lake Macquarie City, Hamilton Olympic and Lambton Jaffas.

Personal life
Swancott still lives and works in Newcastle. Currently working in his own business that supplies Workwear & Safety equipment to Newcastle and the Hunter Region. He also has business interests in mining and strategic procurement projects.

Career statistics

Club

Notes

References

External links

1979 births
Living people
People from Newcastle, New South Wales
Association football goalkeepers
National Soccer League (Australia) players
National Premier Leagues players
Newcastle Jets FC players
Australian soccer players
Newcastle Breakers FC players
Sportsmen from New South Wales
Soccer players from New South Wales